The LattePanda is a Chinese single board computer. It is conceptually similar to the Raspberry Pi, but is significantly more expensive and runs Intel processors instead of ARM. It is capable of running Windows 10 or Linux.

The computer uses Intel Atom processors with a dedicated co-processor for managing the general purpose input / output (GPIO) pins similar to those found on a Raspberry Pi.

Features
The first version of the LattePanda, running Windows 10, was developed by a team in Shanghai through a Kickstarter campaign that began in late 2015. The later versions, Alpha 800 and Alpha 864, added Linux capability. The 864 has a 2.6HGz Intel Core M3 processor, which is designed for good performance and low power consumption to avoid overheating. It also has 8GB of onboard RAM and a built-in Intel HD Graphics 615, which can be used to power a 4K display. However, an External GPU can also be added to increase graphics capability.

There is also a dual M2 connector that allows it to connect to fast NVM Express-based Solid-state drive storage, and an array of GPIO headers allowing connection to various peripherals in the same manner as a Raspberry Pi.

The Alpha has similar specifications and capability as a 12-inch MacBook, despite being around $1,000 cheaper ($358 compared to about $1,200). However, it is still substantially more expensive than the Pi.

Reception
The LattePanda has been well-received. Reviewers have found it runs Windows 10 acceptably and is responsive, and can be used for some video editing.

References

External links
 
 Official website

Single-board computers